Lord Lieutenant of Londonderry may refer to two different offices
Lord Lieutenant of County Londonderry
Lord Lieutenant of the City of Londonderry (originally formally the County of the City of Londonderry, later renamed County Borough of Londonderry